Kollerfjellet is a mountain at Hopen, Svalbard. It has a height of 304 m.a.s.l., and its first known ascent was made in 1924 during topographic works.

The meteorological station Hopen Radio is located between Kollerfjellet and Werenskioldfjellet.

References

Mountains of Svalbard
Hopen (Svalbard)